Langtang Lirung is the highest peak of the Langtang Himal Range, which is a subrange of the Nepalese Himalayas, southwest of the Eight-thousander Shishapangma. The List of the world's highest 100 mountains puts it at number 99.

Location
The Langtang Himal forms the western portion of a complex of mountains which also includes the Jugal Himal, home of Shishapangma. This complex lies between the Sun Kosi valley on the east and the Trisuli Gandaki valley on the west. Langtang Lirung lies near the Trisuli Gandaki, and north of the Langtang Khola. At a distance of 4km towards the east, Tsangbu Ri is located.

Features
Though not high by the standards of major Himalayan peaks, Langtang Lirung is notable for its large vertical relief above local terrain. It has a large south face which long resisted climbing attempts.

Climbing history

The peak was reconnoitered by H. W. Tilman and P. Lloyd in 1949. Attempts were made to climb the peak via the East Ridge in the 1960s, but none got close to the summit.

On 24 October 1978 two members of a Japanese expedition made the first ascent of the mountain via the East Ridge.

Poles made the first winter ascent. On 3 January 1988 Mikołaj Czyżewski, Kazimierz Kiszka and Adam Potoczek stood at the summit.

According to the Himalayan Index, there have been 14 ascents of Langtang Lirung (in 1978, 1980, 1981, 1982, 1986, 1988, 1989, 1992, 1994, and 1995), mostly by the Southeast or Southwest Ridge routes; and 13 unsuccessful attempts on the peak (these may be underestimates).

On 9 November 2009, Slovenian mountaineer Tomaž Humar, who was on a solo climb (the expedition started on 5 October) via the South Face, had an accident during his descent. Sources report that he became stuck on the mountain at an approximate height of 6300 meters with a broken leg (other sources also report broken ribs and damaged spine). His only contact with the base camp staff via a satellite phone was made on the day of the accident, and he appeared to be in a critical condition. Presumably, he died on 9 or 10 November.

Avalanche in 2015
On 25 April 2015, a massive 7.8-magnitude earthquake in Nepal resulted in a landslide on Langtang Lirung. In Langtang village, directly in the path of the landslide, 243 people died.

See also
 List of highest mountains on Earth

References

Sources
 H. Adams Carter, "Classification of the Himalaya," American Alpine Journal 1985.
 Jill Neate, High Asia: An Illustrated History of the 7000 Metre Peaks, 
 Himalayan Index
 DEM files for the Himalaya (Corrected versions of SRTM data)

External links
 A list of mountains ranked by local relief and steepness showing Langtang Lirung as the world #20.
 Pictures of Langtang Lirung with Cheng Liru
 Tomaž Humar dies in Langtang Lirung 

Seven-thousanders of the Himalayas
Mountains of the Bagmati Province